Zoskales (c. 100 CE) was an ancient King in the Horn of Africa. His realm included the ancient city of Adulis in modern day Eritrea.

History
The Periplus of the Erythraean Sea mentions Zoskales as the ruler of the port of Adulis in Eritrea. According to the ancient sources he was miserly but otherwise upright. He also knew Greek.

At least as early as Henry Salt, some scholars, including Sergew Hable Sellassie and Y. M. Kobishchanov, have identified him with Za Haqala, who is listed in the King Lists of the Kingdom of Aksum as having ruled for 13 years, and who ruled between Za Zalis and Za Dembalé. G.W.B. Huntingford points out, on the other hand, that there is not enough information to be certain of this identification. He argues instead that Zoskales was a petty king whose power was limited to only Adulis.

Notes

Kings of Axum
2nd-century monarchs in Africa